Efosa Egwakun (born 1 November 1986 in Delta State) is a Nigerian football player, who plays for Hatta Club in the United Arab Emirates Division 2 Group B, on loan from Algerian Ligue Professionnelle 1 club CS Constantine.

Career
He began his career at Julius Berger FC and joined than to Dolphins F.C. After several years with Dolphins F.C. played for Al-Merrikh in Sudan after his transfer in 2006 from the Nigerian club, he came also with teammate Endurance Idahor. Effosa had been chosen in 2006 by the Confederation of African Football as the second best African young player, second only to Mohammed Barakat from Al Ahly of Egypt. He played from January 2008 to July 2008 on loan with El-Masry in Egypt from Al-Merrikh, the club sold him in July 2008 and he signing a two-year contract with the Egyptian club. On  July 19, 2011, Eguakon  signed a two-year contract with CS Constantine, joining them on a free transfer from Nasr Benghazi.

Position
Effosa's best position is a right sided winger although in Al-Merrikh he was mainly performing as playmaker.

Position
Eguakon can play as offensive central midfield, offensive right midfield or as right forward.

References

1986 births
Living people
Nigerian footballers
Nigerian expatriate footballers
Association football midfielders
Bridge F.C. players
Dolphin F.C. (Nigeria) players
Al-Merrikh SC players
Al-Nasr SC (Benghazi) players
CS Constantine players
Saham SC players
Hatta Club players
Algerian Ligue Professionnelle 1 players
Oman Professional League players
Expatriate footballers in Sudan
Nigerian expatriate sportspeople in Sudan
Expatriate footballers in Egypt
Nigerian expatriate sportspeople in Egypt
Expatriate footballers in Libya
Nigerian expatriate sportspeople in Libya
Expatriate footballers in Algeria
Nigerian expatriate sportspeople in Algeria
Expatriate footballers in the United Arab Emirates
Nigerian expatriate sportspeople in the United Arab Emirates
Expatriate footballers in Jordan
Nigerian expatriate sportspeople in Jordan
Expatriate footballers in Oman
Nigerian expatriate sportspeople in Oman
UAE First Division League players
Libyan Premier League players